Eduard Georg Wilhelm, Duke of Anhalt (18 April 1861 – 13 September 1918) was a German prince of the House of Ascania and the penultimate ruler of the Duchy of Anhalt from April to September 1918.

Early life

Prince Eduard was born at Dessau, the capital of the Duchy of Anhalt, in 1861 as the third son of Duke Friedrich I of Anhalt (1831–1904) and his wife Princess Antoinette of Saxe-Altenburg (1838–1908). As Eduard's eldest brother, Leopold, died without male offspring in 1886, and the next brother, Frederick, had no issue, Eduard became heir presumptive and Hereditary Prince following the death of their father, Duke Friedrich I, in 1904.

Reign
Eduard succeeded his brother Duke Friedrich II of Anhalt on 21 April 1918, but his brief reign came to an end five months later with his own death on 13 September 1918. He was succeeded by his eldest surviving son Prince Joachim Ernst under the regency of Eduard's younger brother, Prince Aribert.

Marriage and children
Duke Eduard married Princess Louise Charlotte of Saxe-Altenburg (1873–1953) in Altenburg on 6 February 1895. She was a daughter of Prince Moritz of Saxe-Altenburg and his wife Princess Augusta of Saxe-Meiningen. They had six children before divorcing in 1918.

Princess Friederike of Anhalt (1896-1896)
Prince Leopold of Anhalt (1897–1898)
Princess Marie-Auguste of Anhalt (1898–1983) married in 1916 Prince Joachim of Prussia
Prince Joachim Ernst of Anhalt (1901–1947)
Prince Eugen Friedrich Ernst August Heinrich Adolf Aribert of Anhalt (1903–1980) married Anastasia Jungmeier (b. 25 July 1901, Straubing – d. 20 February 1970, Vevey) on 2 October 1935. Claimed to be Joachim's immediate successor, considering his son's marriage a morganatic one.
Princess Anastasia of Anhalt (b. 22 December 1940) married in 1962 Maria Emanuel, Margrave of Meissen
Prince Wolfgang of Anhalt (b. 12 July 1912, Schloss Ballenstedt – d. 10 April 1936)

Ancestry

References

 

Dukes of Anhalt
1861 births
1918 deaths
German people of French descent
House of Ascania
Princes of Anhalt
Grand Crosses of the Order of the Dannebrog
Royal reburials